George Cooper Gill (18 April 1876 – 21 August 1937) was an English first-class cricketer who played in 171 matches for Somerset, Leicestershire and London County between 1897 and 1906.

A right-hand bat and right-arm fast medium, Gill scored 4,160 runs (including one century) and took 465 wickets at 25.36 runs per wicket.

References
 
 

1876 births
1937 deaths
English cricketers
Somerset cricketers
North v South cricketers
Leicestershire cricketers
London County cricketers
Staffordshire cricketers